Dolabella may refer to:

People
 Numerous ancient Romans: see Cornelii Dolabellae
 Tommaso Dolabella, painter
 Jean Dolabella, drummer for the Brazilian heavy metal band Sepultura
 Dado Dolabella, Brazilian actor, son of Carlos Eduardo Dolabella

Others
 Dolabella (gastropod), a genus of sea hares from the family Aplysiidae